, also known as Sadako, was an empress consort of the Japanese Emperor Ichijō. She appears in the literary classic The Pillow Book written by her court lady Sei Shōnagon.

Life

She was the first daughter of Fujiwara no Michitaka (藤原道隆).  She was arranged to marry the Emperor upon the ceremony of his age of majority.  She was given the title of Empress, her father was formally appointed regent to the Emperor, and her sister was later married to the Emperor's cousin and Crown Prince.

Empress consort of Japan 
She became the second consort, with the title Chugu, to Emperor Konone. 

Empress Teishi hosted a literary and cultural court, and Sei Shōnagon was appointed her lady-in-waiting. In 995, a series of events unfolded which deteriorated her position. Her father died and was succeeded as regent by his rival, her uncle Fujiwara no Michinaga, and her brothers were exiled from court. The regent her uncle made his daughter Fujiwara no Shōshi the second consort of the Emperor, and secured the title Empress for her as well: for the first time in Japan, the Emperor had two Empresses, Teishi with the title Kōgō and Shōshi with the title Chūgū.  This created fierce rivalry between the two Empresses and her last four years was described as a period of humiliation for her. 

Because of the competition between her and Shoshi, the first consort, the Kana syllabary was developed. During Heian Period court culture specifically, women showed the beauty in their ability to write poetry, play instruments, and paint. Teishi's lady in waiting, Sei Shonagon wrote The Pillow Book as a way to gain the Emperor's affection. However, Shoshi's lady in waiting wrote the famous Tale of Genji, which proved to have more impact on Heian society, ultimately promoting her to the rank of Empress as well. The many political rivalries between Teishi and the Emperor would make her delve into a period of depression and exile. Teishi was considered to be devoted to the Emperor as she showed a moral victory over the regent who attempted to divert the Emperor's affections to Shoshi.

Due to her social removal from society and her father's passing, she entered Buddhist priesthood. She became a Buddhist nun soon after Emperor Kazan ordained.
At the age of 24, unable to produce a male heir, she died in childbirth.

Legacy
Her legacy of inspiring The Pillow Book and humor called Okashii is still maintained today in Japanese society. Because of her depression and social demise, she is remembered as an emotionally charged Empress who was able to subdue minimal power from the regency.

Issue

Imperial Princess Shushi (脩子内親王) (997–1049)
Imperial Prince Atsuyasu (敦康親王) (999–1019)
Imperial Princess Bishi (媄子内親王) (1001–1008)

Notes

Deaths in childbirth
Fujiwara clan
Japanese empresses
Japanese Buddhist nuns
11th-century Buddhist nuns
977 births
1001 deaths
The Pillow Book